"Love After Love" is a poem by Derek Walcott, included in his Collected Poems, 1948–1984 (1986). NPR's Weekend Edition featured a reading of the poem in March 2017.

See also
 Plays by Derek Walcott

References

External links
 Derek Walcott tribute: Linton Kwesi Johnson reads "Love After Love" - BBC Newsnight. 20 March 2017. YouTube video.

Poems
Saint Lucian literature
English-language poems
1986 poems
Philosophical poems